Swinford Preceptory is a former monastery of the Knights Hospitaller located near to the village of Swinford, Leicestershire.

History
The preceptory was founded before 1199, with land at Swinford donated to the Knights Hospitaller by Robert Rivell.

Only a small preceptory, it was under the control of Dalby Preceptory before 1220. By 1338, however, the preceptory had become a "camera" (a lesser establishment dependent upon another), under the administration of a seneschal and bailiff.

The Knights Hospitaller in England were disbanded in 1540, and their preceptories dissolved as part of King Henry VIII's Dissolution of the Monasteries.

See also
Dalby Preceptory
Heather Preceptory
Rothley Temple

References

Monasteries in Leicestershire
Preceptories of the Knights Hospitaller in England